Silverlake Vineyard is a Thai winery located at the foot of Khao Chi Chan. Founded in 2002 by Surachai Tangjaitrong and Supansa Nuangpirom, it is a tourist attraction of Thailand.

Varieties produced include Shiraz, Chenin Blanc, Chardonnay, Sauvignon Blanc, Rose and Cabernet Sauvignon.

References

Vineyards
Wineries of Thailand
Tourist attractions in Chonburi province